Investigation Discovery (Investigação Discovery in Brazil) (stylized as ID since 2020) is a television channel in Latin America dedicated to crime- and investigation-themed programming, owned by Warner Bros. Discovery

History
The channel was launched in October 1997 as the local version of Travel Channel. After the purchase by Discovery Inc. and the BBC, the channel was then renamed "El Nuevo / O Novo Travel Channel: People+Arts" (pronounced as "people and arts"), and again renamed as simply "People+Arts".

The station's programming consisted of a mix of British series, reality shows, hobby programs and some American series, either in their original language with subtitling (Portugal) or dubbed in Spanish/Portuguese with optional English soundtrack; a few Spanish programs originally broadcast by generalist networks also ran on People+Arts.

In January 2010, it was replaced in Portugal on TV Cabo's Channel 82 by Discovery Travel & Living. On April 13, 2010, People+Arts in Latin America was replaced by Liv, originally a channel dedicated to women's entertainment, but quickly evolved into a general entertainment channel, with the addition of series such as Blue Bloods and the 2010 remake of Hawaii Five-O.

On 15 November 2010, BBC Worldwide sold 50% interest in Animal Planet and Liv to Discovery Inc. for $156 million.

On July 9, 2012, Liv was relaunched as the Latin American version of Investigation Discovery (and called Investigação Discovery in Brazil).

Programming

Current programming

Past programming
Second-run:
 Dexter
 Prison Break

as Liv
First-run:
 Blue Bloods
 Cake Boss (currently seen on TLC)
 Extreme Makeover: Home Edition (currently seen on Discovery Home & Health)
 Hair Battle Spectacular
 Happy Town
 Hawaii Five-O (currently seen on AXN)
 Hawthorne
 Hell's Kitchen (currently seen on TLC)
 House of Glam
 How to be a Gentleman
 It Only Hurts When I Laugh
 LA Ink (currently seen on TLC)
 Last Man Standing (currently seen on Comedy Central)
 Life Unexpected
 Mad Love
 Material Girl
 Mercy
 Miami Ink (currently seen on TLC)
 Miami Social
 Parenthood (currently seen in Brazil on GNT)
 Project Runway (currently seen on E!)
 Models of the Runway
 Shear Genius
 So You Think You Can Dance (currently seen on TLC)
 The Tudors
 Whitney

Second-run:
 The 4400
 Brotherhood
 Charmed
 Coach
 Dawson's Creek
 Frasier
 Judging Amy
 Just Shoot Me!
 Once and Again
 Providence
 Rescue Me

as People+Arts
 Afterlife
 Coupling
 Doctor Who (new series)
 Hustle
 Hotel Babylon (Latin America only)
 Murder in Mind
 Spooks
 The Office
 Torchwood
 Army Wives
 Commander in Chief (Europe only)
 Dirt
 Dancing with the Stars (currently seen on BBC Entertainment)
 Less Than Perfect
 Providence (Europe only)
 Rescue Me
 The Shield
 The Starter Wife
 American Chopper (currently seen on Discovery Channel)
 The Apprentice: Donald Trump
 The Apprentice: Martha Stewart
 Changing Rooms
 The Contender
 Extreme Makeover
 Extreme Makeover: Home Edition
 Ground Force
 Globe Trekker (currently seen on TLC)
 I Survived a Japanese Game Show (currently seen on TLC)
 On the Lot
 What Not to Wear (UK)
 What Not to Wear (US, currently seen on Discovery Home & Health)
 While You Were Out
 Wife Swap (UK, US, and Latin America, currently seen on Discovery Home & Health)
 Bricomanía (Europe only)
 Deco (Europe only)

References

External links
 Investigation Discovery Latin America 
 Investigação Discovery Brazil 

Latin America
Portuguese-language television stations in Brazil
Spanish-language television stations
Television channels and stations established in 1997
Television channel articles with incorrect naming style
Warner Bros. Discovery Americas